A constitutional referendum was held in Guinea on 13 October 1946 as part of the wider French constitutional referendum. Although the proposed new constitution was rejected by 54% of voters in the territory, it was approved 53% of voters overall.

Results

References

1946 referendums
October 1946 events in Africa
1946
1946 in French Guinea
Constitutional referendums in France